In mathematical analysis, Heine's identity, named after Heinrich Eduard Heine is a Fourier expansion of a reciprocal square root which Heine presented as

where  is a Legendre function of the second kind, which has degree, m − , a half-integer, and argument, z,  real and greater than one.  This expression can be generalized for arbitrary half-integer powers as follows

where  is the Gamma function.

References

Special functions
Mathematical identities